The Cottage Schools, at 255 E. Stillwater Ave. in Fallon, Nevada, United States, is a historic set of three school buildings that is listed on the U.S. National Register of Historic Places.  As Cottage Elementary School, a school at this site reportedly has four teachers and 39 students.
  It was listed on the National Register of Historic Places in 2008.

References 

National Register of Historic Places in Churchill County, Nevada
Mission Revival architecture in Nevada
Schools in Nevada
School buildings on the National Register of Historic Places in Nevada